The NBC superhero serial drama series Heroes follows the lives of people across the globe who possess various superhuman powers as they struggle to cope with their everyday lives and prevent foreseen disasters from occurring. The second season premiered on September 24, 2007, and was released on DVD and Blu-ray on August 26, 2008. 

Within the seasons of Heroes are "volumes", which allow the writers to focus on shorter story arcs. The second season comprises a single volume of 11 episodes called Generations.

The second season was designed to contain three volumes called Generations, Exodus, and Villains. Exodus was scrapped due to in part to viewer criticism (some fans thought that the show had too slow of a build-up) but mainly due to the 2007–2008 Writers Guild of America strike; whilst Villains was carried over to the show's third season. As a result, the second season consisted of only 11 episodes, 13 fewer than were originally ordered by NBC. Originally, the second season of Heroes was to be followed in April and May 2008 by six stand-alone episodes of a new series, Heroes: Origins. The spin-off was intended as an alternative to a long mid-season hiatus, which led to a drop in ratings for Heroes in its first season. The project, which was later planned to be 12 episodes, was indefinitely postponed due to a decline in viewership and the strike and eventually cancelled.

Plot
"Generations" begins four months after the events of Kirby Plaza. The main plot arc of Generations deals with the Company and its research on the Shanti virus. This research is explored through the Company's founders, whose identities are revealed, as well as through the effects of various strains of the virus. The heroes ultimately come together in an attempt to stop the release of a deadly strain of the virus and avert a global pandemic.

Cast

Main characters
Milo Ventimiglia as Peter Petrelli
Jack Coleman as Noah Bennet
Masi Oka as Hiro Nakamura
Greg Grunberg as Matt Parkman
Adrian Pasdar as Nathan Petrelli
Hayden Panettiere as Claire Bennet
Noah Gray-Cabey as Micah Sanders
Ali Larter as Niki Sanders
Sendhil Ramamurthy as Mohinder Suresh
David Anders as Adam Monroe/Takezo Kensei
Kristen Bell as Elle Bishop
Dania Ramirez as Maya Herrera
Dana Davis as Monica Dawson
James Kyson Lee as Ando Masahashi
Zachary Quinto as Gabriel Gray/Sylar

Recurring characters

Episodes

Reception
The second season of Heroes was criticized by commentators and fans for a much slower pace, less engaging storyline and lack of focus compared to the first season. Milo Ventimiglia stated that "when there's a little bit of a delay, there's not that instant, rewarding scene or moment or episode... people get impatient, so it has been extremely important for them to strike a balance between giving and getting." In an interview with Entertainment Weekly, Heroes creator Tim Kring commented on criticisms of season two, and the series' 15% decline in ratings. Kring said that he felt he had made mistakes with the direction of season two. He had thought that the audience was looking for a "build-up of characters and the discovery of their powers", when viewers were instead looking for "adrenaline." Kring also outlined what he felt were problems with plot development, stating that the second season "took too long to get to the big-picture story", explaining that Peter's vision of the viral armageddon should have occurred in the first episode instead of the seventh. He feels that it would have been better to introduce new characters within the context of the main storyline, as with Elle, rather than in unattached arcs such as that of Maya and Alejandro. Kring also admitted that he should have resolved the "Hiro in Japan" storyline much more quickly, and that the romantic stories are not working well. With regard to Claire and West, and Hiro and Yaeko, he said, "I've seen more convincing romances on TV. In retrospect, I don't think romance is a natural fit for us."

In season two, the opener was consistent in the ratings, however, week-by-week, the ratings continued to dive, reaching another new low for the series on episode seven, "Out of Time", with only 9.87 million viewers. Although the ratings were lower than average, this episode was considered to be a turning point for the declining season, as a major plot twist was introduced and the volume's "big picture storyline" was presented. The season two/volume 2 finale generated 11.06 million viewers in the ratings, down more than 3 million viewers from the season opener and series pilot.

Home media
The DVD and Blu-ray was released on August 26, 2008 in Region 1.

References

02
2007 American television seasons